Gould House may refer to:

Trulock-Gould-Mullis House, Pine Bluff, Arkansas, listed on the NRHP in Jefferson County, Arkansas
Gould-Shaw House, Cloverdale, CA, listed on the NRHP in Sonoma County, California
Thomas Gould, Jr., House, Ventura, California, listed on the NRHP in Ventura County, California
Gould House (Norfolk, Connecticut), listed on the NRHP in Litchfield County, Connecticut
Gould-Weed House, Augusta, Georgia, listed on the NRHP in Richmond County, Georgia
Gould House (Skowhegan, Maine), listed on the NRHP in Somerset County, Maine
Capt. Joseph Gould House, Topsfield, Massachusetts, listed on the NRHP in Essex County, Massachusetts
Zaccheus Gould House, Topsfield, Massachusetts, listed on the NRHP in Essex County, Massachusetts
Samuel Gould House, Wakefield, Massachusetts, listed on the NRHP in Middlesex County, Massachusetts
Amos Gould House, Owosso, Michigan, listed on the NRHP in Shiawassee County, Michigan
Ebenezer Gould House, Owosso, Michigan, listed on the NRHP in Shiawassee County, Michigan
Daniel Gould House, Owosso, Michigan, listed on the NRHP in Shiawassee County, Michigan
Gould Mansion Complex, Lyons Falls, New York, listed on the NRHP in Lewis County, New York
Gould-Guggenheim Estate, Port Washington, New York, listed on the NRHP in Nassau County, New York
Gould House/Greater Parkersburg Chamber of Commerce, Parkersburg, WV, listed on the NRHP in Wood County, West Virginia